Fardin Rabet (born 29 October 2001) is an Iranian professional footballer who plays as a winger for Swedish club Dalkurd in the Superettan.

Club career

Esteghlal Tehran
He made his debut in Iran Pro League for Esteghlal in 26th fixtures of 2019–20 Iran Pro League against Nassaji Mazandaran while he substituted in for Mehdi Ghayedi.

References

External links 

Fardin Rabet at Soccerway 
Fardin Rabet at  PersianLeague.com

Living people
2001 births
People from West Azerbaijan Province
Kurdish sportspeople
Iranian footballers
Esteghlal F.C. players
Dalkurd FF players
Persian Gulf Pro League players
Association football midfielders
Expatriate footballers in Sweden
Iranian expatriate sportspeople in Sweden